This article describes the squads for the 2010 African Women's Championship.

Group A

Mali
Head coach: Moustapha L. Traore

Nigeria
Head coach: Ngozi Eucharia Uche

South Africa
Head coach: August Makalakalane

Tanzania

Group B

Algeria
Head coach: Azzedine Chih

Cameroon
Head coach: Enow Ngachu

Equatorial Guinea
Head coach: Jean-Paul Mpila

Ghana
Head coach: Anthony Edusel

References

squads
Women's Africa Cup of Nation's squads